Diego Leonardo Silva Soares Pereira (born 11 November 1985), better known as Diegol, Brazilian, is a professional football player.

Club career
Diegol, made his debut when 15 years old in the under 15 team of Vasco da Gama in Brazil, and played as a forwarder in the under 20 team and he arrived to the top and professional team with the title of best striker of all the base divisions of the club.

Diego never played in Vasco da Gama as an important player because this forwarder had his rights as a player bought by an important football investor group and he traveled to Uruguay to play in CSD Huracán Buceo and after that to IL Hødd Fotball, in Norway.

Diegol, when he played in the under 17 Vasco da Gama team, played in a pre-season with the Brazilian under 17 national team.

External links
 http://www.vikebladet.no/article/20080728/SPORT/633913984 
 https://archive.today/20130222223340/http://www.smp.no/article/20080731/FOTBALL/637641021 
 http://www.hodd.no/innhold.asp?page=1524&item=37776,1&lang=1 
 http://www.vikebladet.no/article/20080804/SPORT/7268880/1037/NTBI 
 http://www.siste.no/fotball/1-divisjon/article3696000.ece
 http://www.vikebladet.no/article/20080728/SPORT/868947317 
 http://www.smp.no.htest.osl.basefarm.net/article/20080708/FOTBALL/706939670 
 https://web.archive.org/web/20080417052853/http://www.nettsporten.no/newsitem.asp?newsID=1777&NewsCatID=933 
 https://web.archive.org/web/20110724184023/http://fotball.smp.no/eliteserien/article114859.ece 
 http://www.zerozero.pt/br/equipa.php?epoca_id=137&id=12618

1985 births
Living people
IL Hødd players
Brazilian footballers
Brazilian expatriate footballers
Expatriate footballers in Uruguay
Expatriate footballers in Norway
Brazilian expatriate sportspeople in Norway
Brazilian expatriate sportspeople in Uruguay
People from Teresina
Association football forwards
Sportspeople from Piauí